Galgyto Lafael Talea (born February 4, 1988) is a Surinamese footballer playing as a forward for Inter Moengotapoe in the Hoofdklasse and for the Suriname national team.

Career 
Talea began his career in the 2008–09 SVB Eerste Klasse, playing for SV Jai Hanuman in the second division of football in Suriname. Helping his team to promotion to the SVB Hoofdklasse, after winning the league title in his first season with the club. Talea then transferred to SV Robinhood the following season despite his team's promotion. In 2012, he transferred to SV Notch where he would finish as the league's top goal scorer with 18 goals scored in his first season with the club. In 2016, he moved to IMT.

International career 
Talea plays for the Suriname national team having made his debut on 31 October 2010 against the Netherlands Antilles for the 2010 Caribbean Cup qualification. He scored his first goal on 15 November 2013 in the ABCS Tournament in a 2–0 win over Bonaire. On 8 October 2016 he scored his first official goal for Suriname in the match against Guyana in the third round of the Caribbean cup qualification 2016, A match that ended 3-2 for Natio.

Career statistics

International goals
Scores and results list Suriname' goal tally first.

Honors

Club
Jai Hanuman
 SVB Eerste Klasse (1): 2008–09

Individual
SVB Hoofdklasse Top Goalscorer: 2012–13

References

External links 
 

Living people
1988 births
Sportspeople from Paramaribo
Surinamese footballers
Suriname international footballers
S.V. Robinhood players
S.V. Notch players
SVB Eerste Divisie players
Association football forwards
Suriname under-20 international footballers